FG, fg, or Fg may refer to:

Organizations 
 Falun Gong, a Chinese organization
 Fine Gael, an Irish political party
 Fallschirmjäger, German paratroopers
 Finanzgericht, abbreviation for German Fiscal Courts
 FG (restaurant), a Michelin-starred restaurant in Rotterdam, formerly Ivy

Places 
 French Guiana (FIPS PUB 10-4 territory code)
 Province of Foggia, Italy (vehicle registration code)

Science and technology 
 Fg, abbreviation used in physics for the force exerted by gravitation
 fg (Unix), a computer command to resume a suspended process
 Femtogram (fg), a unit of mass
 Fiberglass, a material that includes fine fibers of glass
 Finished good, in manufacturing and inventory], goods that have completed the manufacturing process but have not yet been sold or distributed
 Fixed-gear, a bicycle without the ability to coast
 FlightGear, a free home computer flight simulator

Sport 
 Field goal, a method of scoring in several sports
 Forrest Griffin, a UFC fighter
 FG, an abbreviation in the game of contract bridge for "forcing to game"; see Glossary of contract bridge terms#gameforce

Other uses
 FG 42, a Mauser automatic rifle
 Goodyear FG Corsair, a fighter aircraft
 Radio FG, a French language radio station playing mostly house music
 The type of gunpowder used for large bore rifles and shotguns
 The final Gravity_(alcoholic_beverage) of an alcoholic beverage that has finished its fermentation
 Frank Gasparro, an engraver of the United States Mint

See also
 Functional grammar (disambiguation), grammar models and theories for natural languages